Darche may refer to:

People
 J. P. Darche (born 1975), a retired American and Canadian football long snapper
 Laetitia Darche (born 1991), a Belgian-Mauritian beauty pageant and former Miss Mauritius
 Mathieu Darche (born 1976), a Canadian professional ice hockey player
 Natalis Constant Darche (1856-1947), French army officer
 Noël Darche (1809-1874), a farmer and political figure in Canada East

Organisations

French-language surnames